Mabaruma is the administrative centre for Region One (Barima-Waini) of Guyana. It is located close to the Aruka River (the Venezuelan border) on a narrow plateau above the surrounding rainforest at an elevation of 13 metres.

History
Mabaruma was once a large estate owned by the Broomes family. Cocoa was one of the products manufactured before the Government of Guyana bought part of the land to build Governmental Institutions. Mainly Amerindians live in this area. Some of the tribes include Arawaks, Caribs and Warao. Mabaruma also has a large Afro-Guyanese population with small East Indian, Chinese and Portuguese communities.

It replaced Morawhanna as the regional capital after the former was deemed at risk from flooding. Mabaruma became a town in 2016 with the surrounding villages of Hosororo and Kumaka joining.

Overview
There is a government guest house in the town as well as the Mabaruma Post Office, Mabaruma Hospital, and a police station where court cases are tried. Because of its size however, only petty crimes are tried.
 
Mabaruma contains the region's first secondary school, North West Secondary School, established in 1965. Most local people either do farming or fishing work for a living.

Climate
Mabaruma has a tropical rainforest climate (Af) with heavy to very heavy rainfall year-round.

References

Populated places in Barima-Waini